Zeferino Martins, also known as Ze Martins (born September 5, 1985) is an East Timorese footballer who plays as midfielder for Ad. Dili Oeste and the Timor-Leste national team.

References

External links

1985 births
Association football midfielders
East Timorese footballers
Timor-Leste international footballers
Living people
Dili Oeste footballers